August Van Steelant (8 April 1921 – 24 October 1971) was a Belgian footballer. He played in eight matches for the Belgium national football team from 1948 to 1951.

References

External links
 

1921 births
1971 deaths
Belgian footballers
Belgium international footballers
Place of birth missing
Association footballers not categorized by position